Alva Moore Lumpkin (November 13, 1886 – August 1, 1941) was a United States district judge of the United States District Court for the Eastern District of South Carolina and the United States District Court for the Western District of South Carolina and was a United States senator from South Carolina.

Education and career

Born on November 13, 1886, in Milledgeville, Baldwin County, Georgia, Lumpkin moved with his parents to Columbia, South Carolina, in 1898.  There were seven siblings, who by birth order were: Elizabeth (teacher), Hope (clergyman), Alva (politician), Morris (lawyer), Grace (writer), and Katharine (academic).  He attended the public schools in Milledgeville and Columbia, then received a Bachelor of Laws in 1908 from the University of South Carolina School of Law and was admitted to the bar the same year. He entered private practice in Columbia from 1908 to 1939. He was an assistant clerk for the South Carolina Senate from 1906 to 1908. He was a member of the South Carolina House of Representatives from 1911 to 1913. He was a member of the Conciliation Commission for Advancement of Peace between the United States and Uruguay in 1914. He was an acting assistant attorney general for South Carolina in 1918. He was a member of the South Carolina Board of Pardons from 1922 to 1923. He was an acting Associate Justice of the Supreme Court of South Carolina from 1926 to 1934.

Federal judicial service

Lumpkin was nominated by President Franklin D. Roosevelt on May 17, 1939, to a joint seat on the United States District Court for the Eastern District of South Carolina and the United States District Court for the Western District of South Carolina vacated by Judge John Lyles Glenn Jr. He was confirmed by the United States Senate on May 22, 1939, and received his commission on July 19, 1939. His service terminated on July 22, 1941, due to his resignation.

Brief Senate service and death

Lumpkin was appointed on July 17, 1941, as a Democrat to the United States Senate to fill the vacancy caused by the resignation of United States Senator James F. Byrnes and served from July 22, 1941, until his death in Washington, D.C., on August 1, 1941, after suffering a gastric hemorrhage two days prior. He was interred in Elmwood Cemetery in Columbia, South Carolina.

See also
 List of United States Congress members who died in office (1900–49)

References

Sources
 
 

1886 births
1941 deaths
Democratic Party members of the South Carolina House of Representatives
Judges of the United States District Court for the Eastern District of South Carolina
Judges of the United States District Court for the Western District of South Carolina
United States district court judges appointed by Franklin D. Roosevelt
20th-century American judges
20th-century American politicians
Democratic Party United States senators from South Carolina
Justices of the South Carolina Supreme Court
People from Milledgeville, Georgia